Tyre Extinguishers is an international climate direct action group which deflates the tyres on sport utility vehicles (SUVs). The group acts under the belief they are working towards the reduction of carbon emissions from SUVs, which have a disproportionately large impact on the climate crisis relative to other vehicles. The group has called for a ban on SUVs in cities, and has said that they "want to make it impossible to own a huge polluting 4x4 in the world’s urban areas".

The activists leave leaflets under the vehicles' windscreen wipers "so that the owner is aware that the car is unusable and gets an explanation as to why this has been done."

Activities
Between 7 March 2022 and July 2022, the group claimed to have deflated over 5000 tyres of SUVs worldwide, 
 including areas of London, Cambridge, Brighton and Hove, Bristol, Edinburgh, Liverpool and Sheffield, the Swiss city of Zurich, the German cities of Essen and Dortmund, the Swedish city Gothenburg, in the New Zelander cities of Auckland, Christchurch and Wellington, and in Los Angeles.

Several Tyre Extinguishers splinter groups formed in Scottish cities including Dundee (The Dundeeflators) and Glasgow (The Deflationists),

In July 2022, the group's further actions in the United States took place in New York City, Chicago, Scranton, Pennsylvania and the San Francisco Bay Area. The group claimed its first actions in Canada (Waterloo, Ontario) and France (Paris) the same month.

On one night in September 2022, the group deflated tyres on over 600 SUVs in the UK, France, Germany, Switzerland, the Netherlands, Norway, Denmark, the Czech Republic and Canada. The group claimed these were its debut actions in Denmark, Norway and the Czech Republic.

In October 2022, the organisation claimed to have reached its initial target of 10,000 SUVs deflated since March 2022, with the actions taking place across 15 countries.

Organisation
The name "Tyre Extinguishers" began appearing in 2021, but the group's actions did not begin until March 2022. In 2007, a Swedish group called "The Indians of the Asphalt Jungle" had embraced the same tactic, deflating over 1,500 SUVs (according to its own numbers) and, as reported by Vice, "helping to send the usually relentless growth of domestic SUV sales into a rare reverse".

The group was described by Aston University academics Oscar Berglund and Graeme Hayes as a "pop-up climate movement," given the group's emphasis on individuals or small groups taking action wherever they are using the materials on the Tyre Extinguishers website, rather than a more centralised structure.

Lund University professor Andreas Malm (whose book "How to Blow Up a Pipeline" argues in favor of the sabotage of fossil fuel infrastructure as a form of environmental activism) called the group's actions a form of "extremely peaceful and gentle sabotage." Malm continued, "anyone can deflate an SUV: it is virtually child's play. It requires no formal organization, no leadership, no funds, no implements other than bits of gravel or beans or green lentils. Given the infinitely replicable nature of the action—sabotage as meme—its potential for making SUV ownership less convenient and attractive could not be discounted."

Journalists have noted the actions as criminal and authorities in certain regions have encouraged witnesses to come forward with information. In the U.S., it has been noted "State laws against 'tampering with a motor vehicle' are likely to be enforceable, but of course, first the person would have to be caught in the act of letting the air out of the tires."

References

Locations

External links

2022 protests
Direct action
Environmental protests in the United Kingdom
Environmental organisations based in the United Kingdom
Radical environmentalism
Climate change organizations
2022 establishments in the United Kingdom